may refer to:
 Dōjō-ji, a Buddhist temple in Wakayama Prefecture, Japan
 Dōjōji (Noh play)
 Dōjōji, a 1957 play by Yukio Mishima
 Musume Dōjōji, a Kabuki dance drama based on the Noh play that may also be referred to as Dōjōji